Get Out Alive is a 2013 American Horror/Thriller film directed by Clay Dumaw.  The movie's plot pays tribute to elements from 70s and 80s horror films like The Texas Chain Saw Massacre and The Evil Dead.

Synopsis

While returning from a vacation, siblings, Paul (David Fichtenmayer) and Marilyn (Rhiannon Roberts), fall prey to a pair of homicidal mechanics and their bloodthirsty pet monster.

Cast
David Fichtenmayer as Paul
Rhiannon Roberts as Marilyn
David Iannotti as The Mechanic
Jay Storey as Earl

Reception
The film received an Official Selection at the 2013 Scare-a-Con Film Festival, and won Best Music.

References

External links
 
 

2013 films
2013 horror films
2010s monster movies
American monster movies
2010s English-language films
2010s American films